Scurt may refer to:

Pârâul Scurt, tributary of the Lotru in Vâlcea County, Romania
Pârâul Scurt, tributary of the Valea Cerbului in Prahova County, Romania
Piciorul Scurt, tributary of the Tazlăul Sărat in Neamț County, Romania

See also
Skirt